This is a list of Scottish football transfers featuring at least one 2020–21 Scottish Premiership club or one 2020–21 Scottish Championship club which were completed after the summer 2020 transfer window closed and before the end of the 2020–21 season. Due to the effects of the coronavirus pandemic on the football calendar, the summer window for transfers in Scotland ran until 5 October. Clubs outside the Premiership were permitted to make loan signings during October 2020.

Following the end of the Brexit transition period on 31 December 2020 Scottish clubs were permitted to continue signing players from the European Union during the January 2021 window, as long as they met the criteria of an appeals panel.

List

See also
 List of Scottish football transfers summer 2020
 List of Scottish football transfers summer 2021

References

Transfers
Scottish
2020 in Scottish sport
2021 winter
2021 in Scottish sport